NyLon is the concept of New York and London as twin cities—the financial and cultural capitals of the Anglo-American world. There is a community of high-earning professionals who commute between these cities on the busy transatlantic air route. To satisfy the tastes of this common community, businesses such as Time Out and Conran establish branches in both cities. The magazine Nylon explicitly covers this scene with articles about the two cities.

The dominance of these twin cities was acknowledged by Christine Lagarde who, as French finance minister, wanted Paris to become a similar international financial centre. Other cities which are becoming city-states in the same class include Dubai and Shanghai. But since the financial crisis and following recession, there has been a decline in travel between the two cities. In 2008, news magazine Time coined a neologism "Nylonkong" which supposedly links the cities of New York City, London, and Hong Kong as the eperopoles of the Americas, Euro-Africa, and Asia-Pacific, respectively.

The global city network is made up of numerous pairings or city dyads. When the service flows between these dyads were ranked in 2015, NyLon was first. The top 10 were:

 London – New York 
 London – Hong Kong
 New York – Hong Kong
 London – Paris
 London – Singapore
 New York – Paris
 New York – Singapore
 London – Tokyo
 London – Shanghai
 New York – Tokyo

See also
 Global citizenship
 Jet set
 NY-LON—a TV drama set in the two cities
 NYLON—A magazine titled by the concept
 Special Relationship

References

Culture in London
Culture of New York City
Diaspora studies
Economy of London
Economy of New York City
Globalism
Twin cities
Residency
Tourism campaigns